Yeshivah Centre can refer to either of the following two Orthodox Jewish Australian organisations run by the Chabad-Lubavitch movement:

Yeshiva Centre of Melbourne, Australia
Yeshiva Center of Sydney, Australia